Rubab can refer to:
 Rubab (instrument), a lute-like musical instrument
 Pamiri rubab, a fretless six-strung lute of Tajikistan
 Seni rebab, plucked string instrument of northern India
 Rubab bint Imra al-Qais, wife of Husayn ibn ‘Alī
 Rubab Raza (born 1991), Pakistani Olympic swimmer
 Rubab Sayda (born 1950), Indian politician
 Meera (Irtiza Rubab) (born 1976), Pakistani film actress

See also
 Robab Farahi-Mahdavieh

no:Rubab